Manuel Ramos Otero (July 20, 1948 – October 7, 1990) was a Puerto Rican writer. He is widely considered to be the most important openly gay twentieth-century Puerto Rican writer who wrote in Spanish, and his work was often controversial due to its sexual and political content. Ramos Otero died in San Juan, Puerto Rico, due to complications from AIDS.

Life
Jesús Manuel Ramos Otero was born in Manatí, Puerto Rico, and spent his childhood in his home town, living in the second location of the old building of the Puerto Rican Casino of Manatí. He began his studies at the Colegio La Inmaculada in Manatí.  His family then moved to San Juan when he was seven years old. He later attended the University of Puerto Rico, Río Piedras Campus (1960–1965) and went on to receive a B.A. in Social Sciences (with a major in sociology and a minor in political sciences) from the University of Puerto Rico, graduating in 1969. In 1979 he received an M.A. in literature from New York University. While living in New York City, he worked as a social researcher, and later as a professor at diverse universities including Rutgers University, LaGuardia Community College, York College, and Lehman College. He also established a small publishing house, El Libro Viaje. He organized conferences and gatherings of his Puerto Rican writer friends in the United States such as Giannina Braschi and Luis Rafael Sanchez. He is best remembered as a poet and the author of short stories, but he also wrote a novel and several essays on literary criticism.

In 1990, Otero returned to Puerto Rico to live out his final days. He died on October 7 of that year of complications from HIV/AIDS. His posthumously-published work, Invitación a polvo, which Otero defined as “completely untranslatable,” directly addresses topics around the AIDS crisis. In 1998, the Guadalajara International Book Fair published Tálamos y tumbas prosa y verso, a collection of short stories, and the book of poetry, El libro de la muerte.

In 1999, and again in 2002, the Pergones Theatre company in the Bronx adapted Otero’s short story, “El locura de la locura” to stage the play “El bolero fue mi ruina.” It was then adapted to an off-Broadway show in 2002 and staged by the Hostos Center for the Arts and Culture.

Literary production

Many but not all of Ramos Otero's works focus on autobiographical characters of gay Puerto Rican men who are writers and live in New York City.

One of Ramos Otero's most interesting stories is "La última plena que bailó Luberza" (Luberza's Last Plena Dance), which he published in 1975 in the literary journal Zona de carga y descarga alongside a story by Rosario Ferré ("Cuando las mujeres quieren a los hombres"). Ramos Otero's and Ferré's stories were based on the life of Isabel Luberza Oppenheimer (better known as Isabel la Negra), a famous madam who ran a brothel in the city of Ponce from the 1930s to the 1960s. Ramos Otero's story was later included in his book El cuento de la Mujer del Mar (The Story of the Woman of the Sea).

In his work, Ramos Otero openly defends gay viewpoints and feminist positions. For him, homosexuality represented an outsider status; he did not advocate for full integration, but rather explored the situation of marginal subjects. He also discussed his HIV status and the prejudice and discrimination faced by people affected by AIDS. Most of his production has not been translated and is only available in Spanish.

Works

Essays
"De la colonización a la culonización." Cupey 8, no. 1-2 (1991): 63-79.
"La ética de la marginación en la poesía de Luis Cernuda." Cupey 5, no. 1-2 (1988): 16-29.
"Ficción e historia: Texto y pretexto de la autobiografía." El mundo (Puerto Rico Ilustrado) [San Juan, P.R.] 14 de octubre de 1990: 20-23.

Narrative
Concierto de metal para un recuerdo y otras orgías de soledad. San Juan: Editorial Cultural, 1971.
El cuento de la Mujer del Mar. Río Piedras: Ediciones Huracán, 1979.
Cuentos de buena tinta. San Juan: Instituto de Cultura Puertorriqueña, 1992.
La novelabingo. New York: Editorial El Libro Viaje, 1976.
Página en blanco y staccato. 2nda ed. Madrid: Editorial Playor, 1988 [1987].

Poetry
Invitación al polvo. Madrid: Editorial Plaza Mayor, 1991.
El libro de la muerte. Río Piedras: Editorial Cultural; Maplewood, N.J.: Waterfront Press, 1985.

Collected works
Tálamos y tumbas: prosa y verso. Guadalajara, Jalisco, Mexico: Universidad de Guadalajara, 1998.

Critical reception
Numerous literary scholars have written about Ramos Otero, including Arnaldo Cruz-Malavé, Jossianna Arroyo, Juan G. Gelpí, and José Quiroga. Rubén Ríos Ávila has compared Ramos Otero's experiences in New York to those of the exiled Cuban writer Reinaldo Arenas. Lawrence La Fountain-Stokes has written about Ramos Otero in the context of the Puerto Rican queer diaspora, comparing him to other artists such as Luz María Umpierre, Frances Negrón-Muntaner, Nemir Matos-Cintrón, and Erika Lopez.

See also

LGBT literature
LGBT rights in Puerto Rico
List of Puerto Ricans
List of gay, lesbian or bisexual people
List of LGBT writers
List of Puerto Rican writers
Puerto Rican literature
Puerto Ricans in the United States

References

1948 births
1990 deaths
American male poets
Lehman College faculty
Puerto Rican LGBT poets
Puerto Rican gay writers
New York University alumni
People from Manatí, Puerto Rico
Puerto Rican male short story writers
Puerto Rican short story writers
Puerto Rican poets
Puerto Rican male writers
20th-century American poets
20th-century short story writers
Rutgers University faculty
York College, City University of New York faculty
University of Puerto Rico alumni
20th-century American male writers
AIDS-related deaths in Puerto Rico
20th-century Puerto Rican LGBT people
Gay poets